Marina Nohalez Caballero is a former Spanish football defender. She played ten seasons for Levante UD in the Spanish Superleague before retiring in 2009.

She was a member of the Spain women's national football team and took part in the 1997 European Championship.

References

1974 births
Living people
Spanish women's footballers
Spain women's international footballers
Primera División (women) players
Levante UD Femenino players
Women's association football defenders
20th-century Spanish women